A day spa is a business that provides a variety of services for the purpose of improving health, beauty, and relaxation through personal care treatments such as massages and facials.  The number of day spas in the US almost doubled in the two years from 2002 to 2004, to 8,734, according to the International Spa Association, and by 2020 there were 21,560 spas across the United States, according to Statista.

Differences from beauty salon and destination spa
A day spa is different from a beauty salon, in that it contains facilities such as a sauna, pool, steam room, or whirlpool that guests may use in addition to their treatment.

A day spa is also different from a destination spa, as no overnight accommodation is provided.  In contrast, a destination spa offers similar services integrated into packages that may include diet, exercise programs, instruction on wellness, life coaching, yoga, tai chi, and accommodations in which participants reside for the duration of their stay. It may also function as a day spa, if it allows day access to patrons who are not guests of the resort.

Medspa
A medspa, also known as a medical spa, is a spa that provides the client with medical spa services. Medspas specialize in aesthetic services, including laser hair removal and medical-grade skin therapies. The three most popular procedures at medspas, according to the American Med Spa Association, are: neuromodulators (to soften facial muscle activity and reduce wrinkles, such as Botox), hyaluronic acid fillers (temporary skin fillers, such as Juvederm), and microneedling (to help with skin tightening and the removal of acne scars). Body shaping and contouring account for a 19% share of the global medical spa market, according to one industry report.

They are operated by licensed medical professionals, but generally look and feel like a boutique personal service.  In 2010, there were 1,600 medspas in the US generating $1.1 billion in revenue ($700,000 per medspa on average); by 2018, there were over 5,000 medspas generating $7–8 billion in revenue ($1.4 million per medspa on average). The 2018 profit margin for medspas was 29%. The number was expected to grow to over 10,000 medspas by 2023. As of April 2022, the United States accounted for 37.7% of the global medspa market, which was projected in one study reported by CNBC to reach $25.9 billion by 2026.

Treatments

Treatments that may be provided include body massage, hair, foot massage, facials, waxing, microdermabrasion, body treatments, manicures, pedicures, and aromatherapy.

See also
Spa

References

Further reading
Carol Clinton, MD & Sara Shikhman, Esq. (2022), Medspa Confidential, 

 
Therapy
Balneotherapy
Bathing